A distortion function in mathematics and statistics, for example, is a non-decreasing function such that  and . Distortion functions are used to define distortion risk measures.

Given a probability space , then for any random variable  and any distortion function  we can define a new probability measure  such that for any  it follows that

References 

Functions related to probability distributions